Tom Poole was a footballer who played as a goalkeeper for Burslem Port Vale between 1897 and 1901.

Career
Born in Crewe, Poole played for local sides Whitchurch, Crewe Carriage Works and Nantwich before joining Burslem Port Vale as an amateur in October 1897. He made his debut at the Athletic Ground in a 1–0 defeat by Barnsley St. Peter's in a Midland League match on 9 October. The goal conceded came as Poole managed to punch an indirect free kick into his own goal; he constantly ran out of his area during the match and did not impress. Despite this he signed as a professional in 1898 and was utilized as a reserve until January 1900, at which point he became the first choice goalkeeper. He played 15 Second Division games in the 1899–1900 season after his rival, Herbert Birchenough, was sold on. He lost his place to Alfred Maybury in September 1900 though, after just two games, and was released at the end of the 1900–01 season. He served Shrewsbury Town before returning to Nantwich in November 1906.

Career statistics
Source:

References

Year of birth missing
Year of death missing
English footballers
Association football goalkeepers
Port Vale F.C. players
Midland Football League players
English Football League players